The MTV Movie & TV Awards (formerly the MTV Movie Awards) is a film and television awards show presented annually on MTV. The first MTV Movie Awards were presented in 1992. The ceremony was renamed the MTV Movie & TV Awards for its 26th edition in 2017 to also honor work in television as well as film.

The awards have traditionally been tied to the start of the summer blockbuster season for the film industry, and with the launch of the television awards, the opening of that industry's awards season. The nominees are decided by producers and executives at MTV. The winners are then decided by the general public. Presently, voting is done only through an official MTV Movie & TV Awards voting website. Winners are presented with the "golden popcorn" statue made by New-York-firm Society Awards.

Production process
For much of its history, the ceremony was recorded for later broadcast, unlike the MTV Video Music Awards, which are usually live, but not live-to-tape, where the ceremony occurred in chronological order with appropriate edits. This meant that the ceremony was recorded out of order with the host segments recorded all at the start, followed by the musical performances and then award presentations, where those artists and actors nominated could choose to stay only for their award category and then depart after, with a seat filler filling their seat before or afterwards. After 2006, when Survivor producer Mark Burnett (who took over duties from Joel Gallen for the 2007 awards) took over production duties, it began to be broadcast live most years, though since 2017, it has been recorded to air on a one or two-day delay, but broadcast live-to-tape.

Since 2007, polls for several awards have been voted on through MTV's web and social media presences.

Due to the COVID-19 pandemic, there was no word about the 2020 awards, either regarding the nominations or a date for the ceremony. Internally, the network had discussed a permanent move of the ceremony to December, which would place it in the early portion of awards season before the Golden Globe Awards.

On December 6, 2020, MTV aired a one-off special hosted by Vanessa Hudgens, MTV Movie & TV Awards: Greatest of All Time, which highlighted the greatest moments of film and television since the 1980s, as well as moments from past editions of the ceremony. The network stated a goal for a larger, weekend-long ceremony in 2021. MTV announced on March 11, 2021 that the 2021 MTV Movie & TV Awards would be held on May 16 and 17, 2021; the second night of the ceremony will be entitled MTV Movie & TV Awards: Unscripted (hosted by Nikki Glaser) and focus exclusively on reality television.

Award categories

Retired awards

Special awards

Lifetime Achievement Award

Silver Bucket of Excellence

Generation Award

Trailblazer Award

Comedic Genius Award

Years

Film parodies
Since 1993, scenes are spoofed, mostly from that year's most popular films, although television shows and older movies have also been chosen. This may include sound and video montages, replacing some of the original cast with other actors (commonly, the hosts of each year's show) generally mocking the scenes of that film. The diversity of the spoofs can vary greatly, from one dialogue (such as in 2005) to several long scenes, including fighting and action sequences (2003).

See also

 List of American television awards

Notes

References
 Steve Hochman, "Awards as American as 'Pie' and Other Silliness"; Television, L.A. Times, June 7, 2000, Calendar page 3;

External links
 2019 MTV Movie & TV Awards Official Site
 2018 MTV Movie & TV Awards Official Site
 2017 MTV Movie & TV Awards Official Site
 2016 MTV Movie Awards Official Site
 2015 MTV Movie Awards Official Site
 2014 MTV Movie Awards Official Site
 2013 MTV Movie Awards Official Site
 2012 MTV Movie Awards Official Site
 2011 MTV Movie Awards Official Site
 2010 MTV Movie Awards Official Site
 2009 MTV Movie Awards Official Site
 2008 MTV Movie Awards Official Site
 MTV Movie Awards Official Archive
 MTV Movie website
 
 Best Spoofs from the MTV Movie Awards
 2007 MTV Movie Awards Spoof site

 
American film awards
American television awards
American television specials
Movie Awards
Awards established in 1992
Lifetime achievement awards
American annual television specials
1992 establishments in the United States